Öwez Öwezow (born 11 June 1997) is a Turkmen weightlifter. He represented Turkmenistan at the 2020 Summer Olympics in Tokyo, Japan.

References

External links 
 

Living people
1997 births
Turkmenistan male weightlifters
Weightlifters at the 2020 Summer Olympics
Olympic weightlifters of Turkmenistan
21st-century Turkmenistan people